Tomas Švedkauskas (born 22 June 1994) is a Lithuanian professional footballer who plays as a goalkeeper for FC Hegelmann.

Club career
Švedkauskas was signed by Ascoli on a temporary deal in mid-2015. He was assigned number 22 shirt.

On 19 August 2016 Švedkauskas was signed by Lupa Roma. On 31 January 2017 Švedkauskas was signed by Catanzaro on a temporary deal.

In October 2021, he returned to Lithuania and joined Dainava.

International career
Švedkauskas has made 5 appearances for the Lithuania's Under 21 National team.

He did his debut for the senior national team on 8 June 2018 in a friendly loss (1–0) against Iran where he played the entire match.

References

External links
 

 lfe.it Profile (Lithuanian)
 RomaForever Profile
 UEFA Profile
 UEFA Under-21 Profile

1994 births
Sportspeople from Marijampolė
Living people
Lithuanian footballers
Lithuania youth international footballers
Lithuania under-21 international footballers
Lithuania international footballers
Association football goalkeepers
A.S. Roma players
Paganese Calcio 1926 players
Delfino Pescara 1936 players
S.C. Olhanense players
Ascoli Calcio 1898 F.C. players
Lupa Roma F.C. players
U.S. Catanzaro 1929 players
FC UTA Arad players
FK Riteriai players
Lommel S.K. players
Serie B players
Serie C players
Liga Portugal 2 players
Liga II players
A Lyga players
Challenger Pro League players
Lithuanian expatriate footballers
Lithuanian expatriate sportspeople in Italy
Expatriate footballers in Italy
Lithuanian expatriate sportspeople in Portugal
Expatriate footballers in Portugal
Lithuanian expatriate sportspeople in Romania
Expatriate footballers in Romania
Lithuanian expatriate sportspeople in Belgium
Expatriate footballers in Belgium